Schulzendorf is a railway station in Heiligensee (a locality of the Reinickendorf borough) in Berlin. It is served by the S-Bahn line .

References

Railway stations in Berlin
Berlin S-Bahn stations
Buildings and structures in Reinickendorf
Railway stations in Germany opened in 1893